Performance improvement is measuring the output of a particular business process or procedure, then modifying the process or procedure to increase the output, increase efficiency, or increase the effectiveness of the process or procedure. Performance improvement can be applied to either individual performance, such as an athlete, or organisational performance, such as a racing team or a commercial business.

The United States Coast Guard has published the Performance Improvement Guide (PIG), which describes various processes and tools for performance management at the individual and organisational levels.

Organisational development 
In organisational development, performance improvement is organisational change in which the managers and governing body of an organisation put into place and manage a program which measures the current level of performance of the organisation and then generates ideas for modifying organisational behaviour and infrastructure which are put into place to achieve higher output. At the organisational level, performance improvement usually involves softer forms of measurement such as customer satisfaction surveys which are used to obtain qualitative information about performance from the viewpoint of customers.

The primary goals of organisational improvement are to increase organisational effectiveness and efficiency to improve the ability of the organisation to deliver goods and or services. A third area sometimes targeted for improvement is organisational efficacy, which involves the process of setting organisational goals and objectives. Performance improvement can occur at different levels: an individual performer, a team, an organisational unit, or the organisation itself.

Corporate or commercial 
In business, human performance in sales, operations and employee engagement is able to be improved through psychologically rewarding experiences "which can trigger a host of intrinsic human emotions and behaviour as identified by Maslow. Including rewards in a performance improvement solution is a proven strategy to engage employees and align them with the company's goals. Stimulating awards can be cash or non-cash. The addition of non-cash awards to the total rewards package may bring out the performance potential of people because it separates a reward from being used as or perceived as ordinary salary income. Non-cash awards are thought to motivate higher achievement of and drive greater returns on investment. Cash as a reward can also be spent on day-to-day items like food or gas and does not create the increased "psychological reward" of achieving special items, or points to acquire items. By connecting with all levels of the organisation, a complete rewards package may amplify performance across the organisation and bring personal goals into alignment with organisational goals," according to Maritz, LLC. Reward programs supporting improvement in sales and operations can be effectively paid for from the increase in revenue or profits which flow from the program, and without spending to reward for your current levels.

There is evidence that monetary rewards are not effective outside the context of very rote work. In some cases, monetary incentive plans may decrease employee morale, as in Microsoft's stack-ranking system, where the total reward amount is fixed and employees are graded on an artificially fitted distribution

Individual development 
Performance improvement at the individual or employee level can be addressed through formal or informal recognition. Examples of formal recognition can include an "employee of the month" award or a spot bonus. Whereas, an example of informal recognition includes genuine acknowledgement, approval, and appreciation for work well done. Performance improvement at the operational or individual employee level usually involves processes such as statistical quality control.

Performance improvement plans 

If an employee's performance is unsatisfactory, the employer may set out a performance improvement plan (PIP) to help the employee improve. This may be because the employee is failing to meet the goals for their role, or due to other problems such as poor behavior or interpersonal skills. A PIP is usually a written document, and it should clarify expectations for the employee, articulate how the employee is failing to meet them, lay out what improvements are expected, explain whether and how managers will support the employee in improving, and indicate what the consequences will be if the employee fails to improve. The expected improvements should be specific and measurable, and consequences for failing to meet them might include a transfer, demotion, or termination.

Typically, the employee's manager and someone from human resources meet with the employee to discuss the PIP. According to Donald L. Kirkpatrick, a PIP should be developed by the manager and the employee together, because it requires both of their participation in order to be successful. The American Society for Human Resource Management recommends that "a PIP should be used when there is a commitment to help the employee improve", not just as a way to prepare to terminate the employee, but some companies do use PIPs simply as a way to start a termination.

Methods 
Performance is an abstract concept and must be represented by concrete, measurable phenomena or events to be measured. Baseball athlete performance is abstract covering many different types of activities. Batting average is a concrete measure of a particular performance attribute for a particular game role, batting, for the game of baseball.

Performance assumes an actor of some kind but the actor could be an individual person or a group of people acting in concert.  The performance platform is the infrastructure or devices used in the performance act.

There are two main ways to improve performance: improving the measured attribute by using the performance platform more effectively, or by improving the measured attribute by modifying the performance platform, which in turn allows a given level of use to be more effective in producing the desired output.

For instance, in several sports such as tennis and golf, there have been technological improvements in the apparatuses used in these sports. The improved apparatus in turn allows players to achieve better performance with no improvement in skill by purchasing new equipment. The apparatus, the golf club and golf ball or the tennis racket, provide the player with a higher theoretical performance limit.

Performance is a measure of the results achieved. Performance efficiency is the ratio between effort expended and results achieved. The difference between current performance and the theoretical performance limit is the performance improvement zone.

Another way to think of performance improvement is to see it as improvement in four potential areas:
 input requirements; e.g. working capital, material, replacement or reorder time, and set-up requirements.
 throughput requirements, often viewed as process efficiency; this is measured in terms of time, waste, and resource utilisation.
 output requirements, often viewed from a cost/price, quality, functionality perspective.
 outcome requirements; i.e. did it end up making a difference.

Cycle 
Business performance management and improvement can be thought of as a cycle:
 Performance planning where goals and objectives are established.
 Performance coaching where a manager intervenes to give feedback and adjust performance.
 Performance appraisal where individual performance is formally documented and feedback delivered.

Behaviour modification 

In his study of innate human needs, psychologist Abraham Maslow in his concept of a hierarchy of needs identified esteem and social fulfillment, garnered by recognition by family and peers, as a basic human need, and therefore able to be tied to structured programs that increase performance. Abraham Maslow, on “Third Force” psychology, combines aspects of behavioural, cognitive, and emotional psychology, and accounts for the impact of culture and society on behaviour.

See also 

 Employee development
 Feedback
 Collaborative method
 Human performance technology
 Performance engineering
 Performance measurement
 Personal development
 Operations research
 Management science

References

External links

 Carnegie Mellon Software Engineering Institute CMMI.
 Office of Personnel Management.
 International Society for Performance Improvement.
  Improving the performance of a single function in ICT.

Business process management